Boush–Tazewell House is a historic home located at Norfolk, Virginia, USA. It was built about 1783–1784, and is a two-story, Georgian frame house, five bays wide and two bays deep, with a slate covered deck-on-hip roof. It has a two-level, tetrastyle pedimented portico supported by slender Tuscan order columns on both levels. It originally stood in downtown Norfolk and was completely dismantled and re-erected in its present location around 1902. The house was purchased in 1810 by Congressman, Senator and Governor Littleton Waller Tazewell (1775-1860). His family continued to occupy the house until 1894.

It was listed on the National Register of Historic Places in 1974.

References

Houses on the National Register of Historic Places in Virginia
Georgian architecture in Virginia
Houses completed in 1784
Houses in Norfolk, Virginia
National Register of Historic Places in Norfolk, Virginia
Tazewell family